Edgerton School District is located in Edgerton, Wisconsin. Currently there are about 550 students at Edgerton High School. The district recently built a three-court field house and a 599-seat performing arts center. Both are connected to the high school. Edgerton's varsity baseball team won the state championships in 1990. The volleyball team also went undefeated and won the conference championship in 2008.

References

External links
Edgerton School District site

School districts in Wisconsin
Education in Rock County, Wisconsin
Education in Dane County, Wisconsin